Ashworth may refer to:

Ashworth (surname)
Ashworth (clothing) a golf apparel company
Ashworth Hospital in Merseyside, England
Ashworth University in Georgia, United States
Ashworth scale, a measure of spasticity
Mount Ashworth
Ashworth Glacier
Ashworth Archaeological Site, a significant archaeological site in the extreme southwestern corner of the U.S. state of Indiana

See also
Ashworth Act, a Texas law concerning free African Americans
Ashworth Moor Reservoir, Lancashire
Ashworth Improvement Plan, a report that recommended a number of improvements to be made to the electrified suburban railways of inner city Melbourne, Australia